Veronica Lauren (born December 17, 1980) is an American actress. She played Alice, the young girlfriend of Elijah Wood's character, in Forever Young (1992), and is best known for playing Hope Burnford in the 1993 film Homeward Bound: The Incredible Journey and its 1996 sequel Homeward Bound II: Lost in San Francisco. Her other film credits have included roles in The Grass Harp (1995), Charlie's Ghost Story (1995) and American Pie (film series) (1999).  She also had roles on TV shows including Dark Shadows, Days of Our Lives, Home Improvement and Cold Case.

References

External links

1980 births
Living people
21st-century American actresses
American film actresses
American soap opera actresses
Place of birth missing (living people)